Animal Crossing: Pocket Camp is a 2017 free-to-play social simulation mobile game in Nintendo's Animal Crossing series for iOS and Android devices. It was released in Australia in October 2017 and worldwide the following month. The game continues the series of social simulations that allow players to interact with a small campsite with various campers, performing small tasks, engaging in commerce, and decorating living spaces.

Gameplay 

Animal Crossing is a series of social simulation video games in which players customize their avatars' living spaces and communities by trading materials and favors for decorative items. In Pocket Camp, the player decorates a campsite in lieu of a town, and gathers materials such as wood and cotton from the surrounding area to trade for furniture orders. The player-character befriends neighboring animal characters, who can visit the player's campsite, as can other human players both invited and at random. The player's avatar can travel to multiple locations, such as Sunburst Island or Saltwater Shores, and a marketplace that sells furniture and avatar clothing. The player's customization options extend to their avatar's gender, facial traits, and recreational vehicle abode.

Neighbors in nearby "recreation sites" reward the player with crafting materials for completing requests. A local craftsman, the alpaca Cyrus, turns these resources into furniture, pools, and new locations. The player can attract specific neighbors by placing their favorite furniture at the campsite. Each visit increases that relationship's experience level, in a new game mechanic for the series. Akin to previous games, the player can fish and pay off a debt on their home.

In lieu of the villager interaction seen in previous titles, Pocket Camp takes a complex look at the villager relationship system. Each villager has a specific relationship level that is increased by performing tasks and chatting with them each day. The player is then rewarded with furniture and clothing representative of the villager's aesthetic.

The mobile game features optional microtransactions that can be purchased to improve gameplay. Compared to the main series games, a new currency, Leaf Tickets, are obtainable within the game or through microtransactions, which the player can use to reduce in-game timers or to craft without raw materials. The player accrues Leaf Tickets by completing in-game tasks or buying the currency outright through the real-world app store. The player can also trade Leaf Tickets for special event furniture, which attracts specific characters to the player's campsite. The game's developer plans to introduce seasonal events and furniture with limited availability.

In addition to Leaf Tickets, the game features purchasable fortune cookies that reward randomized items depending on type of fortune cookie. These loot boxes are typically released for a limited time, and their themes are typically associated with a villager. Fortune cookies can be found by visiting the Market Place, and they can be purchased by either Leaf Tickets or bells. Players can purchase a fortune cookie for 50 Leaf Tickets or 5,000 bells. Each fortune cookie contains 10 limited-edition items ranging from 3-star ratings to 5-star ratings. The 5-star rating item is the rarest to obtain, and it unlocks a Scrapbook Memory pertaining to the villager associated with the cookie. Fortune cookie purchases also come with redeemable stamp cards. Players receive a stamp every time they purchase a fortune cookie. Every time players reach 10 stamps, they can exchange their stamp cards with a selected fortune cookie item. When players purchase 5 fortune cookies at once for 250 Leaf Tickets, they receive an extra stamp for a total of 6 stamps.

Reoccurring events 
There are several events in the game that are repeated with similar game-play elements and different rewards. These include but are not limited to:

 Fishing tournaments
 Garden events
 Scavenger hunts

These events generally last about a month and features a microtransaction element to speed up the rewards for the event. They tend to stay simple and do not stray too far from what is required to efficiently participate in each event.

Subscriptions 
On November 20, 2019, Nintendo released two subscription plans for players to purchase in Animal Crossing: Pocket Camp. The Happy Helper Plan allows users to choose a villager who helps the campsite by gathering materials, earning bells, and fulfilling villager requests. The chosen villager also earns rewards for the player by participating in reoccurring events. The plan gives subscribers 60 Leaf Tickets every time the subscription is renewed. The Furniture and Fashion Plan allows players to save design layouts and distributes five Fortune Cookies to players each month. These Fortune Cookies contain themed furniture/clothing items that are no longer available to purchase in the game. Both subscription plans also help reduce furniture and clothing crafting time, and allow players to access the Pocket Camp Club Journal, which contains articles, images, and videos of Animal Crossing villagers interacting with each other, and increase storage space for players to store furniture items. Upon their release, the Happy Helper Plan cost $2.99 per month, and the Furniture and Fashion Plan cost $7.99 per month.

On 27 January 2022 Nintendo released a third plan, the Merry Memories Plan allowing players to customise an in game planner. The plan allows for access to the planner sticker shop, the ability to lin with Google Fit or the iOS Health app to record steps, increased rewards from seasonal in-game events and 20 leaf tickets per month.

Development and history 
Nintendo planned a mobile game in its Animal Crossing series among the company's first smartphone releases, as announced in early 2016. The Animal Crossing series was selected for its wide demographic reach. The mobile game was originally scheduled for release later that year but was later delayed, as Nintendo prioritized its release of Super Mario Run. Over the next year, Nintendo experimented with microtransactions in the mobile Fire Emblem Heroes. On October 25, 2017, Nintendo revealed Pocket Camp during a Nintendo Direct presentation as its fourth mobile app. It was released in Australia the same day for iOS and Android platforms, and was released worldwide in 41 other countries on November 21, 2017. An update in December 2017 brought limited edition Christmas-themed items, such as Santa Claus outfits and Christmas trees.

Nintendo's concerns over the loot box gameplay present in Pocket Camp led to the decision to revoke access to downloading or playing the game for Belgium users, starting from August 27, 2019.

Reception 

Animal Crossing: Pocket Camp received "mixed or average" reviews, according to review aggregate Metacritic. Praise was given by Polygon for the game's approach to introduce mobile players to the gameplay of the main series games, although the results were somewhat mixed over the time-dependent gameplay. Polygon described the tutorial to be too overly extensive, but welcomed the concept of organizing and completing various activities according to real-time.

By September 2018, the game had grossed . , the game has grossed over  worldwide.

Accolades 
Less than a week before its worldwide release, the game won the award for "Studio of the Year" (Nintendo EPD) at the 2017 Golden Joystick Awards; after it was released, it was nominated for "Best Mobile Game" in IGN's Best of 2017 Awards. In Game Informers Reader's Choice Best of 2017 Awards, it took the lead for "Best Simulation Game". It was also nominated for the A-Train Award for Best Mobile Game at the New York Game Awards 2018, for "Mobile Game of the Year" at the 2018 SXSW Gaming Awards, and for "Mobile Game of the Year" at the 2018 Golden Joystick Awards. At the Famitsu Awards, it won the Excellence Prize.

Notes

References

External links 
 

2017 video games
Animal Crossing video games
Android (operating system) games
Free-to-play video games
Gacha games
IOS games
Life simulation games
Multiplayer and single-player video games
Nintendo Entertainment Planning & Development games
Social simulation video games
Video games containing battle passes
Video games containing loot boxes
Video games developed in Japan
Video games featuring protagonists of selectable gender
Video game spin-offs
Video games with customizable avatars
Video games with downloadable content